Ibrahim Elsamni is an Egyptian former footballer who played at both professional and international levels.

Career
Elsamni played club football in the Egyptian Premier League with Al-Sekka Al-Hadid.

He also represented Egypt at international level.

Personal life
Elsamni's two sons, Ali and Osama, are both professional players.

References

Year of birth missing (living people)
Living people
Egyptian footballers
Egypt international footballers

Association footballers not categorized by position